Mutsk is a village in the Sisian Municipality of the Syunik Province in Armenia. The Armenian architect, Baghdasar Arzoumanian was born here in 1916.

Etymology 
The village was previously known as Bardzravan and Mazra.

Demographics 
The National Statistical Service of the Republic of Armenia (ARMSTAT) reported its population was 375 in 2010, down from 376 at the 2001 census.

References 

Populated places in Syunik Province